Ichinoya Mitsuru (born 28 December 1960 as Tetsuhiro Matsuda) is a former sumo wrestler from Tokunoshima, Ōshima, Kagoshima Prefecture, Japan. His highest rank was  sandanme 6. He is a rare example of a national university graduate joining professional sumo. Entering Takasago stable at age 23, he fought until the age of 46, making him one of the oldest ever .

Career
At 46 years of age, Ichinoya was the oldest man in professional sumo since the start of the Shōwa era in 1926. When he began his sumo career in November 1983 his stablemate, former yokozuna Asashōryū was just three years old. He was the oldest wrestler in sumo for 62 tournaments, from the retirement of Dairyū in July 1997 until his own retirement in November 2007.

Ichinoya was interested in sumo from a very young age. He grew up on Tokunoshima island, which was the birthplace of the 46th Yokozuna Asashio Tarō III. He studied physics at the University of the Ryukyus in Okinawa, and started up a sumo club there. Upon graduation he attempted to enter professional sumo but was turned away by a number of stables due to lack of height (at 166 cm he was below the minimum requirement of 173 cm). After help from Wakamatsu Oyakata (the former Fusanishiki) he moved into Wakamatsu stable and did chores there and worked on stretching exercises before making his official debut in the November 1983 tournament. In July 1989 he became the first graduate of a national university to win a yūshō or tournament championship when he took the jonidan division title. In 1990 his stable master retired due to ill health and was replaced by the former Asashio Tarō IV. In 2002 Wakamatsu stable merged with Takasago stable. He never rose higher than the fourth sandanme division, but he was much admired simply for his longevity and his determination in fighting opponents more than twenty years his junior. At the tournament in May 2007, ranked at Jonidan 87, he fought back from 0-3 down to achieve a 4–3 score and kachi-koshi. In November 2007, having completed 1000 professional bouts, he announced that he was retiring after 24 years in sumo. He also announced his intention to marry.

Ichinoya remained as the general manager of Takasago stable, looking after its day-to-day running. He is also a keen computer enthusiast and keeps a regular blog on the heya's website.

In February 2008 Ichinoya had his retirement ceremony, or danpatsu-shiki, at a hotel in Tokyo, along with his wedding reception. Asashōryū was among the attendees.

Interviewed in 2020 upon the occasion of his successor as oldest wrestler since the Showa era, Hanakaze, turning 50, Ichinoya (now known as Tetsuhiro Matsuda again) argued that although older wrestlers may not contribute much to sumo in sporting terms, they were important to the successful running of stables and the hosting of the tournaments.

Career record

See also
Glossary of sumo terms
List of past sumo wrestlers

References

External links
 

1960 births
Living people
Japanese sumo wrestlers
Sumo people from Kagoshima Prefecture
People from the Amami Islands